Meryre or Meryra (“Beloved of Ra”) was an ancient Egyptian male name, occurring both as a personal and as a throne name. A variant is Merenre, the female version is Merytre. Famous bearers were:

As a personal name
 Meryre, treasurer under Amenhotep III, tutor of Prince Siatum (18th dynasty)
 Meryre, High Priest of Aten (18th dynasty)
 Meryre, steward of the royal harem in Amarna (18th dynasty)
 Meryre, a son of Ramesses II and Nefertari, 11th on the list of princes
 Meryre, another son of Ramesses II, possibly named after the first Meryre; 18th on the list of princes

As a throne name
 Pepi I (Meryre)
 Nemtyemsaf I (Merenre)
 Nemtyemsaf II (Merenre)

Sources

Ancient Egyptian given names
Egyptian masculine given names
Theophoric names